Allan Paule De Guzman (born January 1, 1970, in Cebu City), better known as Allan Paule, is a Filipino actor. Paule has appeared in more than 100 movies and television series. Paule also unsuccessfully ran for councilor of Muntinlupa from the 1st district in 2013 and in 2016.

Filmography

Television/Digital

Film

Awards and nominations

Footnotes

Further reading
 Edna Versoza, "Allen Paule Gets Better with Age," Philstar.com, November 3, 2006.

External links

1965 births
Living people
Filipino male film actors
Filipino male television actors
GMA Network personalities
ABS-CBN personalities
People from Muntinlupa
People from Cebu City